
Year 284 (CCLXXXIV) was a leap year starting on Tuesday (link will display the full calendar) of the Julian calendar. At the time, it was known as the Year of the Consulship of Carinus and Numerianus (or, less frequently, year 1037 Ab urbe condita). The denomination 284 for this year has been used since the early medieval period, when the Anno Domini calendar era became the prevalent method in Europe for naming years.

Events 
 By place 
 Roman Empire 
 Emperor Numerian travels through Bithynia (Asia Minor) on his way home to Rome. Suffering from an inflammation of the eyes, he travels in a closed litter in which soldiers find his decaying corpse.  
 November 20 – The commander of Numerian's domestici (household troops), Diocles, is chosen to be the new emperor. In a military assembly outside Nicomedia (modern İzmit, Turkey), Diocles claims that the praetorian prefect (and rival for the throne) Arrius Aper murdered Numerian, and he personally stabs and kills the prefect on the spot. The new emperor changes his name to the Latinised 'Diocletian'. Building on existing trends, Diocletian presents his rule as that of a god-like dominus or autocrat. 
 Sabinus Julianus, the praetorian prefect of Emperor Carinus, exploits the instability and usurps the throne in northern Italy.

 Persian Empire 
 King of Kings Bahram II installs Mirian III, of the House of Mihran, on the throne of the Kingdom of Iberia. Mirian would rule the kingdom until his death in c. 361.

 Korea 
 Yurye becomes king of the Korean kingdom of Silla.

 By topic 
 Religion 
 Rufinus succeeds Dometius as Bishop of Byzantium.

Births 
 Fu Hong (or Pu Hong), Chinese general and prince (d. 350)
  Huai of Jin, Chinese emperor of the Jin Dynasty (d. 313)

Deaths 
 November 20 – Numerian, Roman emperor (b. 254) 
 Lucius Flavius Aper, Roman general and praetorian prefect
 Sun Hao, Chinese emperor of the Eastern Wu state (b. 243)

References